Dirk Polder (23 August 1919 – 18 March 2001) was a Dutch physicist who, together with Hendrik Casimir, first predicted the existence of what today is known as the Casimir-Polder force, sometimes also referred to as the Casimir effect or Casimir force. He also worked on the similar topic of radiative heat transfer at nanoscale.

In 1978 Polder became member of the Royal Netherlands Academy of Arts and Sciences.

References

Obituary
 Q. H. F. Vrehen, Dirk Polder, Levensberichten en herdenkingen (Koninklijke Nederlandse Akademie van Wetenschappen, 2002), pp. 57–63.  

1919 births
2001 deaths
20th-century Dutch physicists
Academic staff of the Delft University of Technology
Leiden University alumni
Members of the Royal Netherlands Academy of Arts and Sciences
Scientists from The Hague